Gregory Joseph Sierra (January 25, 1937 – January 4, 2021)  was an American actor known for his roles as Detective Sergeant Chano Amengual on Barney Miller, Julio Fuentes, the Puerto Rican neighbor of Fred G. Sanford on Sanford and Son, and as Marruja in The Castaway Cowboy (1974).

Early life 
Gregory Joseph Sierra was born on January 25, 1937, in Manhattan. He was raised in Spanish Harlem by an aunt as his parents did not take charge of his care. After serving in the Air Force, Sierra went with a friend to an acting school audition in Manhattan. Mr. Sierra was only there to support his friend, but after performing some improvisation he was admitted instead of his friend.

Career
He began his career on the stage, touring with the National Shakespeare Company, and in 1967 appeared as the Duke of Austria in King John at the New York Shakespeare Festival. He then moved to Los Angeles in the late 1960s to work in film and television. 

Sierra's film credits include The Flying Nun (1969), Beneath the Planet of the Apes (1970), Papillon (1973), The Towering Inferno (1974), The Prisoner of Zenda (1979) and The Trouble with Spies (1987). 

In 1973, Sierra guest-starred in an unusually dramatic episode of All in the Family in the role of Paul Benjamin, who was a Jewish activist with the "Hebrew Defense Association" (based on the Jewish Defense League) fighting antisemitism in the neighborhood. In the plot, he volunteers in helping to chase away neo-Nazi thugs who spray-painted a swastika on the Bunkers' front door. He is later killed by a car bomb planted by the neo-Nazis.

From 1972 to 1975, he had the recurring role of Julio Fuentes, a Puerto Rican neighbor of the Sanfords, on Sanford and Son. After that he spent two years as part of the ensemble cast of Barney Miller, as Detective Sergeant Chano Amengual. He starred as Dr. Tony Menzies on the short-lived 1977 sitcom A.E.S. Hudson Street. In 1980 and 1981, for the fourth and unresolved final season of the soap opera parody Soap, he played Latin American revolutionary Carlos "El Puerco" Valdez, Jessica Tate's lover.

In 1984, he was hired for the main cast of Miami Vice where he played Lieutenant Lou Rodriguez, but he asked to be written out of the series after four episodes, not wanting to reside in Miami where the show was being filmed, according to the season 1 DVD commentary; he was subsequently replaced by Edward James Olmos and his character, Lieutenant Martin Castillo. He had regular roles on the TV shows Zorro and Son (1983) and Something is Out There (1988–1989).

In 1992, Sierra played drug dealer Felix Barbossa in the Bill Duke-directed film Deep Cover, which also starred Laurence Fishburne and Jeff Goldblum, and appeared in the comedy sequel Honey, I Blew Up the Kid. The following year he played an Iraqi patrol boat captain in the comedy Hot Shots! Part Deux. He also played a man named Villanazul in the low-budget 1998 movie The Wonderful Ice Cream Suit. He also appeared as Corbin Entek in the Star Trek: Deep Space Nine episode "Second Skin".

His television credits also include Mod Squad, Kung Fu, Alias Smith and Jones, Mission: Impossible (3 episodes), Hawaii Five-O, Gunsmoke, The Greatest American Hero, Midnight Caller, The Fresh Prince of Bel-Air, The X-Files, Murder, She Wrote, Hart to Hart, and Hill Street Blues.

Personal life and death
Sierra was of Puerto Rican descent. He married Eileen Defelitta in 1969, and they were divorced in 1972. In 1976, he married Susan Pollock, and they remained wed until her death in 1978. He lived in Laguna Woods, California, with his wife, Helen Tabor. Sierra died on January 4, 2021, after a long battle with stomach and liver cancer, three weeks before his 84th birthday.

Filmography
Sources:

Film

Beneath the Planet of the Apes (1970) - Verger
Getting Straight (1970) - Garcia
Weekend of Terror (1970) - Police Sergeant
Red Sky at Morning (1971) - Chamaco
Machismo: 40 Graves for 40 Guns (1971) - Lopez
Pocket Money (1972) - Chavarin
The Culpepper Cattle Co. (1972) - One-Eyed Horsethief
The Wrath of God (1972) - Jurado
The Thief Who Came to Dinner (1973) - Dynamite
The Clones (1973) - Nemo
Papillon (1973) - Antonio
The Laughing Policeman (1973) - Vickery 
Goodnight Jackie (1974) - Paul
The Castaway Cowboy (1974) - Marruja (Bryson's henchman)
The Towering Inferno (1974) - Carlos
The Night They Took Miss Beautiful (1977) - Omar Welk
Mean Dog Blues (1978) - Jesus Gonzales
Evening in Byzantium (1978) - Fabricio
The Prisoner of Zenda (1979) - The Count
The Night the Bridge Fell Down (1983) - Diego Ramirez
Let's Get Harry (1986) - Alphonso
The Trouble with Spies (1987) - Capt. Sanchez
Deep Cover (1992) - Barbosa
Honey, I Blew Up the Kid (1992) - Terence Wheeler
Hot Shots! Part Deux (1993) - Iraqi Patrol Boat Captain (uncredited)
A Low Down Dirty Shame (1994) - Captain Nunez
The Wonderful Ice Cream Suit (1998) - Villanazul
Vampires (1998) - Father Giovanni
Jane Austen's Mafia! (1998) - Bonifacio
The Other Side of the Wind (2018) - Jack Simon (final film role)

Television

It Takes a Thief - episode  - Rock-Bye, Bye, Baby - Fletcher (1969) 
The Flying Nun - episode  - A Ticket for Bertrille - Officer Juarez (1969) 
Mission: Impossible - episode - Phantoms - Gomal (1970)
McCloud - episode - Portrait of a Dead Girl - 1st Deputy (1970) 
Mission: Impossible - episode - Chico - Prado's butler (1970)
Mod Squad - episode - A Town Called Sincere - Zamaron (1970) 
Alias Smith and Jones - episode - Journey from San Juan - Juan (1971)
Mission: Impossible - episode - Cocaine - Fernando Laroca (1972)
Sanford and Son - 12 episodes - Julio Fuentes (1972-1975)
Insight - episodes - "Hey, Janitor", The Eye of the Camel, Loser Take All, Plus Time Served, & A Decision to Love (1973 - 1981)
Kung Fu - episode - "The Stone" - Solly (1973)
All in the Family - episode - "Archie is Branded" - Paul Benjamin (1973)
The Waltons - episode - "The Gypsies" - Volta (1973)
Hawaii Five-O - episode - "Tricks Are Not Treats" - Lolo (1973) 
Banacek - episode - The Two Million Clams of Cap'n Jack - Norman Esposito (1973)
Gunsmoke -  3 episodes - Blue Jacket / Osuna (1973-1975) 
McCloud - episode- This Must Be the Alamo - Patrolman Rico Cross (1974) 
Columbo - episode - Publish or Perish - Lou D'Allessandro (1974)
Barney Miller - 35 episodes - Det. Sgt. Chano Amengual (1975-1976)
Hunter - episode - The K Group: Parts 1 & 2  (1977) 
A.E.S. Hudson Street - 5 episodes - Dr. Tony Menzies (1978)
Soap - 12 episodes - Carlos 'El Puerco' Valdez (1980-81) 
The Greatest American Hero - episode - Hog Wild - Sheriff Mark Vargas (1981) 
Hart to Hart - episode - A Couple of Harts - Eduardo (1981) 
Quincy M.E. - episode - Baby Rattlesnakes - Rick Durado (1982) 
Hill Street Blues — ADA Alvarez — four episodes (1982)
Zorro and Son - Commandante Paco Pico (1983)
Kenny Rogers as The Gambler: The Adventure Continues - TV Movie - Silvera (1983)
Simon & Simon - episode - The Club Murder Vacation - Gregory Cable (1983) 
Miami Vice - 4 episodes - Lt. Lou Rodriguez (1984) 
The Paper Chase - episode - Burden of Proof - Public Defender (1984)
Blue Thunder - episode - The Long Flight - Luis Creighton Acuna (1984) 
Hart to Hart - episode - Max's Waltz - Howard Castle (1984) 
Cagney & Lacey - episode - Violation - Eddie 'Cleanhead' Stutz (1985) 
Simon & Simon - episode - The Enchilada Express - Raul Gutierrez (1985) 
Airwolf - episode - Wildfire - Frank Ochoa (1986)
MacGyver - episode - The Gauntlet - General Antonio Vasquez (1985)
Murder, She Wrote - episode - Broadway Malady - NYPD Det. Sgt. Moreno (1985) 
MacGyver - episode - Jack of Lies - Colonel Antunnez (1986) 
Hunter - episode - Flashpoint - Councilman Elandro (1987)
Magnum, P.I. - episode - Pleasure Principle - Miguel Torres (1987) 
Cagney & Lacey - episode - Ahead of the Game - Coach Kellino (1987) 
The Munsters Today - episode - Farewell Grandpa - Don Steinburg (1988) 
Super Password - Himself (Celebrity Contestant) (1988) 
Murder, She Wrote - episode - Murder Through the Looking Glass - Sanchez (1988)
Growing Pains - episodes - The New Deal: Parts 1 & 2 - Dr. Paul Ramirez (1989)
MacGyver - episode - The Treasure of Manco -  Captain Diaz (1990)
Unspeakable Acts - movie - Frank Fuster (1990)
The Golden Palace - episode - Ebbtide for the Defense - Rubin (1992)
Murder, She Wrote - episode - Day of the Dead - Ramon (1992)
The Fresh Prince of Bel-Air - episode - Will Gets Committed - Hector (1992) 
The X-Files - episode - Jersey Devil - Dr. Diamond (1993) 
Murder, She Wrote - episodes - The Petrified Florist, A Nest of Vipers, & Film Flam - Lieutenant Gabriel Caceras (1993-1995)
Thea: How I Got Over (TV Episode 1993) Mr.Gutierrez
Star Trek: Deep Space Nine - episode - Second Skin - Entek (1994)
Dr. Quinn, Medicine Woman - episodes - The Washington Affair: Parts 1 & 2 - General Ely Samuel Parker (1994)
Walker, Texas Ranger - episode - Standoff - Col. Rafael Mendoza (1995)
Ellen — General Colon — episode: When the Vow Breaks (1996)

References

External links 
 
 
 
 

1937 births
2021 deaths
Male actors from New York City
Military personnel from New York City
People from East Harlem
American male film actors
American people of Puerto Rican descent
American male stage actors
American male television actors
Hispanic and Latino American male actors
American male Shakespearean actors
Deaths from cancer in California
Deaths from liver cancer
Deaths from stomach cancer
20th-century American male actors
21st-century American male actors